Angelina is a diminutive form of the name Angela, a name derived from the Greek angelos (Greek αγγελος) meaning "messenger".

People
Angelina of Serbia (1440–1520), Serbian Orthodox saint and consort of Serbian Despot Stefan Branković
Angelina Banytė (born 1949), Lithuanian painter
Angelina Beloff (1879–1969), Russian-born artist who did most of her work in Mexico
Angelina Carreño Mijares (born 1981), Mexican politician
Angelina Dehn (born 1995), aka Ängie, Swedish singer
Angelina Eberly (1798–1860), innkeeper during the Texas Archives War
Angelina Eichhorst, Head of the EU Delegation to the Lebanese Republic from January 2011
Angelina Fares (born 1989), Israeli beauty pageant contestant
Angelina Gabueva (born 1988), Russian tennis player
Angelina Golikova (born 1991), Russian speed skater
Angelina Grimké (1805–1879), American abolitionist and suffragist
Angelina Weld Grimké (1880–1958), journalist and poet
Angelina Grün (born 1979), German Olympic volleyball player, born in Tajikistan
Angelina Gualdoni (born 1975), artist based in New York
Angelina Margaret Hoare (1843–1892), English missionary to British India
Angelina Jensen (born 1973), Danish curler
Angelina Jolie (born 1975), American film actress, UN Goodwill Ambassador
Angelina Kanana (born 1965), Kenyan long-distance runner
Angelina Kučvaļska (born 1998), Latvian figure skater
Angelina Kysla (born 1991), Ukrainian artistic gymnast
Angelina Maccarone (born 1965), German film director and writer
Angelina Melnikova (born 2000), Russian artistic gymnast
Angelina Michshuk (born 1988), Kazakhstani sport shooter
Angelina Mikhaylova (born 1960), Bulgarian former basketball player who competed in the 1980 Summer Olympics
Angelina Muñiz-Huberman (born 1936), Mexican writer and poet
Angelina Napolitano (1882–1932), immigrant to Canada who murdered her abusive husband in 1911
Angelina Nikonova (born 1976), Russian filmmaker, script writer and film producer
Angelina Pivarnick (born 1986), American television personality, model, professional wrestler and singer
Angelina Sandoval-Gutierrez (born 1938), Filipino jurist, Associate Justice of the Supreme Court of the Philippines
Angelina Telegina (born 1992), Russian ice dancer
Angelina Teny, South Sudan politician, state minister of Energy and Mining
Angelina Turenko (born 1988), Russian former competitive figure skater
Angelina Wapakhabulo (born 1949), founding member and Co-chair of the United Way Board, Uganda
Angelina Virginia Winkler (1842–1911), American journalist, editor, magazine publisher
Anna Angelina Wolfers (born 1978), German actress, model and entrepreneur
Angelina Yates (born 1980), New Zealand netball player in the ANZ Championship
Angelina Yushkova (born 1979), Russian gymnast
Angelina Zhuk-Krasnova (born 1991), Russian athlete specialising in the pole vault

Fictional characters
Angelina Ballerina, fictional mouse created by author Katharine Holabird and illustrator Helen Craig
Angelina Veneziano, from the American soap opera The Young and the Restless

See also
Angelina (disambiguation)
Angela (given name)

English feminine given names
Greek feminine given names
Italian feminine given names